The Virginia House of Delegates election of 2011 was held on Tuesday, November 8.

Results

Overview

By House of Delegates district 
Party abbreviations: D - Democratic Party, R - Republican Party, L - Libertarian Party, IG - Independent Green Party, I - Independent.

Seats that changed hands 
 Democratic to Republican (7)
 2nd district
 10th district
 12th district
 20th district
 64th district
 93rd district
 99th district

 Independent to Republican (1)
 59th district

See also 
 2011 United States elections
 2011 Virginia elections
 2011 Virginia Senate election

References 

House of Delegates
Virginia House of Delegates elections
Virginia House of Delegates